Lia Aymara "Leah" Duarte Ashmore (born 5 April 1995) is a Paraguayan model and beauty pageant titleholder who was crowned Miss Universe Paraguay 2022. As Miss Universe Paraguay, Ashmore represented Paraguay at Miss Universe 2022.

She was previously crowned as Miss Grand Paraguay 2017 and represented Paraguay at the Miss Grand International 2017 where she finished in the Top 20.

Pageantry

Miss Paraguay 2022
On August 26, 2022 Ashmore represented the department of Guairá and 14 other finalists competed for four titles in the Miss Paraguay 2022 at Paseo La Galería in Asunción. At the end of the event, she was crowned as Miss Universe Paraguay 2022 and succeeded Miss Universe 2021 1st Runner-Up Nadia Ferreira.

Miss Universe 2022
Ashmore will represent Paraguay at Miss Universe 2022.

References

External links

Living people

1995 births

Miss Universe 2022 contestants

Paraguayan beauty pageant winners
Paraguayan female models